This is a selective list of canal locks in the United Kingdom which have unique features or are notable in some other way. This list is not comprehensive.

Gallery

See also

Canals of the United Kingdom
Camden Lock, Commercial Road Lock, Limehouse Basin Lock
Locks on the Kennet and Avon Canal
Boat lift, Caisson, Caisson lock, Canal inclined plane, Canal pound, Flash lock, Lock staircase, Pound lock
List of canal aqueducts in the United Kingdom
List of canal basins in Great Britain
List of canal junctions in Great Britain
List of canal tunnels in the United Kingdom

References

Canal
Canals in the United Kingdom
 List
Canal locks
Canal